The Heber Amusement Hall (also known as the Heber Social Hall) is a community and civic center in Wasatch County, Utah.

History 

Built in 1908 from nearby sandstone and mostly by volunteer labor, the amusement hall was inspired by the Apollo Hall in American Fork, Utah, and at the time was one of only a few dance floors that were spring-mounted. A kitchen was added in 1917. The amusement hall, along with the Wasatch Stake Tabernacle, was listed on the National Register of Historic Places on December 2, 1970. It is owned by Heber City and has been used as a senior citizen center. It is currently the home of Timpanogos Valley Theatre and still a major hub of social life in the Valley, providing communiy theater productions and youth productions for large numbers of young locals every year.

References

External links

Buildings and structures completed in 1908
Buildings and structures in Heber City, Utah
Event venues on the National Register of Historic Places in Utah
Properties of the Church of Jesus Christ of Latter-day Saints
The Church of Jesus Christ of Latter-day Saints in Utah
National Register of Historic Places in Wasatch County, Utah
1908 establishments in Utah